Janam Se Pehle is a 1994 Indian Bollywood thriller drama film directed by B. R. Ishara. It stars Raj Babbar and Farah in pivotal roles.

Plot
Geeta is the defense lawyer of Kishan Puncha in a murder trial. Geeta realises that Kishan committed three murders due to some unknown fact which relates with his birth. Geeta started her investigation to know the past of the accused.

Cast
 Raj Babbar as Kishanlal Puncha
 Farah as Geeta Bhardwaj
 Sumeet Saigal as Ramesh
 Swapna as Radha
 Shafi Inamdar as Dr. Verma
 Sadashiv Amrapurkar as Judge Vishwanath Mahajan
 Viju Khote as Teerathram 
 Brahmachari as Amarnath Shetty

Soundtrack

References

External links

1990s Hindi-language films
1994 films
Films scored by R. D. Burman
Indian thriller drama films